South Dakota Highway 53 (SD 53) is a state route that runs north to south across  south central South Dakota.  It consists of two separate segments:
 Junction with Interstate 90 and U.S. Highway 83 near Vivian to South Dakota Highway 44 east of Wood.
 U.S. Highway 18 west of Winner to the Nebraska border southeast of Keyapaha.

History
South Dakota 53 in 1926 ran from the North Dakota to Nebraska borders.  By 1929, when U.S. Highway 83 was first designated, it replaced the segment of SD 53 from Pierre to the North Dakota border.  The southern segment was further east than the present route, running from Presho south to the Nebraska border via Winner.

In the early 1930s, U.S. 83 was extended south into Nebraska, and was placed as dual signage along SD 53.  (The original route was on what is now U.S. Highway 183; 83 and 183 were reversed from current alignments when first designated.)  By 1935, SD 53 was removed from this alignment and placed on a new route extending south from Vivian, on a previously unnumbered road.  The southern terminus was at South Dakota Highway 40 (now 44).  Also at this time, the northern terminus was pulled back to Vivian.

In the late 1960s, a second segment of SD 53 was added further south, beginning at U.S. Highway 18 just west of the U.S. 183 junction, and extending south to Clearfield.

In 1996, the southern terminus of SD 53 was extended to the Nebraska border.

Major intersections

References

External links

South Dakota Highways Page: Highways 31-60

053
Transportation in Tripp County, South Dakota
Transportation in Mellette County, South Dakota
Transportation in Lyman County, South Dakota
U.S. Route 83